Elkin Township is one of fifteen townships in Surry County, North Carolina, United States. The township had a population of 6,524 according to the 2000 census.

Geographically, Elkin Township occupies  in southwestern Surry County.  Elkin Township's southern border is the Yadkin River.  The only incorporated municipality within Elkin Township is the Town of Elkin, the second largest municipality in Surry County.

Townships in Surry County, North Carolina
Townships in North Carolina